The Bayern Kurve is roller coaster like amusement ride that moves a train around a banked circular track, gaining speed as the ride progresses. It is made in both a portable and park model and originally debuted in 1965. It was invented by German engineer Anton Schwarzkopf.

During the ride, riders sit in one of the sixteen bobsled-themed cars that travel at a high-speed around a circular single-hilled track. Riders start in an upright position and as the cars pick up speed, they tilt inward toward the center of the ride. This ride is also known for its loud horn which is similar to that of a diesel train engine that blasts its loud roar when the ride reaches maximum speed. Also akin to a train, the seamed track creates the same rail "click-clack" railway sound, particularly at the lower section of track in the front.  Additionally, the ride has a distinct whine that increases with speed due to its tire/blade drive.

While the ride was originally manufactured by Schwarzkopf, a similar version known as the Olympic Bobs was also manufactured by Chance Rides.

Specifications

There are 16 cars capable of holding 2 passengers each making the maximum capacity 32 riders.
Theoretically this ride can thrill a maximum of 900 riders per hour.
The entire ride weighs approximately 29 tons.
The outer diameter of the ride is approximately 21 meters.
The portable version of this ride is transported by 3 trailers.
The absolute top speed is approximately 75 mph (120 km/h), but it is typically run at 40 mph (64 km/h) in most parks.

Appearance
Although Bayern Kurves have been known to be re-themed on occasion, they are famous for their original Olympic bobsled appearance. The ride has a backdrop painted to look like mountain scenery with spectators looking down at the track. Originally there was a strip of lights running beneath the spectators. There is a lighted sign that reads "Bayern Kurve" and flashing sun mounted above the mountains and sometimes there are chasing lights added to edge the tops of the mountains. There are lighted Olympic rings mounted on the mountains below the track with a wooden bobsled figure on each side of the rings. The sixteen cars were each built with headlights and in some cases, the front of each car had the flag of a different nation painted on the front. The loading platform is surrounded by a railing with the Olympic rings in it and has a lighted, scalloped awning above it in parts.  Also, there are lighted trees on poles in the loading platform. As mentioned above, this ride has been re-themed on numerous occasions and certain features are occasionally added or removed.

Installations
The following is a partial list of Bayern Kurve installations.

References

Amusement rides